Esmeralda Cárdenas Sánchez (born 3 April 1975) is a Mexican lawyer and politician affiliated with the National Action Party. She served as Deputy of the LX Legislature of the Mexican Congress representing Colima, and previously served in the LIV Legislature of the Congress of Colima.

References

1975 births
Living people
Politicians from Jalisco
21st-century Mexican lawyers
Women members of the Chamber of Deputies (Mexico)
Members of the Chamber of Deputies (Mexico)
National Action Party (Mexico) politicians
21st-century Mexican politicians
21st-century Mexican women politicians
University of Colima alumni
Panamerican University alumni
Members of the Congress of Colima